Ciclotic acid, or cyclotic acid, systematic name 4-methylbicyclo[2.2.2]oct-2-ene-1-carboxylic acid, is a bicyclic carboxylic acid. The salts and esters of ciclotic acid are known as ciclotates (cyclotates). An example is nandrolone cyclotate, a long-acting ester prodrug of the anabolic-androgenic steroid nandrolone.

See also
 Buciclic acid

References

Carboxylic acids
Polycyclic nonaromatic hydrocarbons